Epoka University (EU) is a private university founded in 2007 in Tirana, Albania. The university received accreditation by the Quality Assurance Agency of Higher Education in 2011.  It offers Bachelor, Master of Science, Professional Master and PhD degrees. There are six PhD programs that are administered solely by Epoka staff in: Architecture, Civil Engineering, Computer Engineering, Economics, Political Science and International Relations and Business Administration. It offers a joint degree with Leeds Metropolitan University.

At the Webometrics Ranking of World Universities, EU holds the first place among universities in Albania.

Epoka is an authorised IELTS registration Centre for the British Council in Albania. The university is a signatory of Magna Charta Universitatum and a member of the UNESCO based worldwide association of International Association of Universities.

Epoka University has three faculties, the Faculty of Architecture and Engineering, the Faculty of Economics and Administrative Sciences and the Faculty of Law and Social Sciences, eight academic departments, and three research centres:

 Faculty of Architecture and Engineering

Architecture (5-year Integrated Second Cycle Study Program)

Civil Engineering

Computer Engineering

Electronics and Digital Communication Engineering Banking and Finance

 Faculty of Economics and Administrative Sciences

Business Administration

Economics

Business Informatics

Banking and Finance

Banking and Finance (Albanian)

International Marketing and Logistics Management

  Faculty of Law and Social Sciences

Political Science and International Relations

Law (5-year Integrated Second Cycle Study Program)

Epoka University attracts students from Albania, Turkey, Kosovo, Montenegro, and Macedonia, [1], Italy, Norway, USA, [2], Jordan and all around the world. The language of instruction at Epoka University is English.[8] The study programs are compatible with the Bologna system. The Rinas campus is located 12 km (30 minutes) from the city centre, near the Tirana International Airport.

The language of instruction at Epoka University is English. The study programs are compatible with the Bologna system. The Rinas campus is located 12 km (30 minutes) from the city centre, near the Tirana International Airport.

See also
List of universities in Albania
List of colleges and universities
List of colleges and universities by country

References

External links
 Epoka University
 Epoka University Self-Evaluation Report

Universities and colleges in Tirana
Educational institutions established in 2007
Universities in Albania
2007 establishments in Albania